Waldir Lucas Pereira Filho (5 February 1982 – 20 June 2021) was a Brazilian professional footballer who played as a forward.

He died from COVID-19 aged 39 on 20 June 2021.

References

External links
 
 

1982 births
2021 deaths
Deaths from the COVID-19 pandemic in São Paulo (state)
Brazilian footballers
Association football forwards
Ligue 1 players
Ligue 2 players
K League 1 players
AC Ajaccio players
Suwon Samsung Bluewings players
Ethnikos Piraeus F.C. players
Associação Desportiva São Caetano players
Duque de Caxias Futebol Clube players
América Futebol Clube (SP) players
Brazilian expatriate footballers
Brazilian expatriate sportspeople in France
Expatriate footballers in France
Brazilian expatriate sportspeople in South Korea
Expatriate footballers in South Korea
Brazilian expatriate sportspeople in Qatar
Expatriate footballers in Qatar
Brazilian expatriate sportspeople in Greece
Expatriate footballers in Greece
Sportspeople from Campinas